Dominique Kivuvu (born 16 September 1987) is an Angolan footballer who plays for ZSGOWMS in the Dutch Derde Klasse. 

He formerly played for CFR Cluj and Mjällby AIF. He is also a former international for the Angolan national team.

Club career
Kivuvu is a midfielder who was born in Amsterdam and made his debut in professional football, being part of the Stormvogels Telstar squad in the 2005–06 season.

Kivuvu is very well known for his intense strength and his high work rate, and these attributes have allowed him to establish a starting position for NEC Nijmegen, in the heart of their midfield. He's also known for having a very powerful, accurate shot, which he showed by scoring a screamer against giants Feyenoord. Kivuvu, who has dual citizenship, has been making his mark in the Eredivisie – the Dutch premier division – with NEC Nijmegen. After that, Kivuvu played for CFR Cluj in Romania and FC Oss.

Angola
Kivuvu was released by FC Oss in August 2013 after tearing his achilles tendon. In 2014, he was on trial at FC Eindhoven several times, without this resulting in a contract. In January 2015, he signed with Angolan club Kabuscorp. In June, his contract was terminated after a change of head coach. Later that summer, Kivuvu signed a six-month contract with Progresso Sambizanga.

Later career
On 8 January 2016, it was announced that Kivuvu would train with his former club NEC to keep his condition up to standard. In the 2016–17 season, Kivuvu played for FC Oss, after having trained with them from March 2016. His contract expired in 2017. In February 2018, he joined DOVO, where he had also trained beforehand. In the summer of 2018, Kivuvu went to DUNO. As of the 2019–20 season, Kivuvu plays for lower-tier amateur club ZSGOWMS.

International career

Angola
Dominique Kivuvu was the captain of the Netherlands national under-20 football team at the 2008 Toulon Tournament. But being Netherlands-born Angolan, he has been also chased by the Angolan Soccer Association to play for the Angola national football team. He has reportedly accepted the offer to play for Angola at the Nations Cup, to be held in Angola in January 2010.

Kivuvu played his first game for Angola's national team on September 6, 2009, against Senegal.

Honours

Club
CFR Cluj
 Romanian Supercup (1)): 2010

References

1987 births
Living people
Dutch footballers
Association football midfielders
Netherlands youth international footballers
Angola international footballers
SC Telstar players
NEC Nijmegen players
Footballers from Amsterdam
Dutch people of Angolan descent
Eredivisie players
Eerste Divisie players
Liga I players
Allsvenskan players
Girabola players
CFR Cluj players
Mjällby AIF players
Kabuscorp S.C.P. players
Progresso Associação do Sambizanga players
TOP Oss players
VV DUNO players
Dutch expatriate footballers
Angolan expatriate footballers
Expatriate footballers in Romania
Expatriate footballers in Sweden
Angolan expatriate sportspeople in Romania
Dutch expatriate sportspeople in Romania
Angolan footballers